"Lonely Blue Boy" (originally entitled "Danny" and sung by Elvis Presley) is a song written by Ben Weisman and Fred Wise and performed by Conway Twitty. It reached #6 on the U.S. pop chart and #27 on the U.S. R&B chart in 1960.  It was featured on his 1960 album Lonely Blue Boy.

The song ranked #38 on Billboard magazine's Top 100 singles of 1960.

Other versions
Cliff Richard and The Drifters featuring the Mike Sammes Singers released a version of the song as "Danny" on their 1959 album Cliff.
Marty Wilde released a version of the song as "Danny" on the B-side to his 1959 single "A Teenager in Love".
Vince Eager released a version of the song as a single in 1960 in United Kingdom, but it did not chart.
Graham Bonnet released a version of the song as "Danny" on his 1977 album Graham Bonnet. The song peaked at number 79 in Australia.
Billy Hancock with The Tennessee Rockets released a version of the song as the B-side to their 1980 single "Redskin Rock 'N Roll".
Shakin' Stevens released a version of the song on his 1980 album Marie Marie.
The Spiders released a version of the song on their 1998 album Rock & Roll Renaissance.
Elvis Costello and the Attractions released a version of the song on the 2002 re-release of the album Blood & Chocolate.
Bill Wyman's Rhythm Kings released a version of the song on their 2001 album Double Bill.
The Beat Farmers released a version of the song on their 2003 live album Live at the Spring Valley Inn, 1983.
Dale Watson released a version of the song on his 2016 album Under the Influence.

In popular culture
Elvis Presley sang the original version of the song titled "Danny". It was intended to be in the 1958 film King Creole but was cut from the final release. It was featured on the 1997 re-release of the film's soundtrack.
Twitty's version was featured in the 2002 film Punch-Drunk Love and featured on the film's soundtrack.

References

1958 songs
1959 singles
1960 singles
Songs with music by Ben Weisman
Songs with lyrics by Fred Wise (songwriter)
Conway Twitty songs
Cliff Richard songs
Shakin' Stevens songs
Elvis Costello songs
Elvis Presley songs
Song recordings produced by Pip Williams
Song recordings produced by Nick Lowe
MGM Records singles